Laviana (Asturian: Llaviana) is a municipality in the Autonomous Community of the Principality of Asturias, located in Spain. It is bordered on the north by Bimenes and Nava, on the south by Aller, on the east by Piloña and Sobrescobio, and on the west by San Martín del Rey Aurelio and Mieres.

Situated in the basin of the Rio Nalon, it is a terminal for the FC de Langreo railway, now subsumed by FEVE, which connects it to the port of Gijón.

Economy

Mining, agriculture and stock-rearing have been the principal industries since the early 20th century.

History

Almost everywhere in Asturia you find Prehistorian Signs, also in the region Laviana. Some Hill Forts and Dolmen made in the Bronze Age and in the Iron Age are still visitable (Castro de El Cercu, El Prau in Castiello and La Corona in Boroñes).Also the Romans built some Bridges along the Rio Nalon Street which are used today.

The name Flaviana was written down first time, in 1115 when the area was bordered to the Monastery "San Vicente de Oviedo".During the Peninsular War and the Carlism revolution, Laviana was the area for some famous battles.

Coat of arms
 Top left: Coat of Arms from family León > León
 Middle left: Coat of Arms from family León  > France
 Bottom left: Coat of Arms from family Quirós
 Top right: Coat of Arms from family León  > Holy Roman Empire (Austria)
 Middle right: Coat of Arms from family León  > Castile
 Bottom right: Coat of Arms from family Alvarez de las Asturias
 The middle: the Victorycross

Demography

Politics
The current mayor of Llaviana is Julio García Rodríguez (FSA-PSOE), in office since 20/10/2017.

Points of interest

 Iglesia (Church) de San Nicolás (from the 12th century)
 Iglesia de Nuestra Señor de Otero
 La Casona de los Menéndez (cheese production)
 also take a look into the website  Monumentos

Fiesta and feria
Almost every month, there are some special events in the region, the important dates you find on the website ´´Fiestas´´

Parroquias (parishes)

Famous people
Armando Palacio Valdés, writer
Los Berrones, agro-rock group
Roberto Canella, football player
Viti Rozada, football player

References

External links

 Citypage 
Federación Asturiana de Concejos 
Foros de Laviana (web-forum about Laviana) 

Municipalities in Asturias